Luz is a civil parish in the municipality of Santa Cruz da Graciosa on the island of Graciosa in the Portuguese Azores. The population in 2011 was 683, in an area of 11.70 km². It contains the localities Alto do Sul, Fajã da Folga, Folga, Carapacho, Luz and Pedras Brancas.

References

Freguesias of Santa Cruz da Graciosa